Sir David James Shackleton  (21 November 1863 – 1 August 1938) was a cotton worker and trade unionist who became the third Labour Member of Parliament in the United Kingdom, following the formation of the Labour Representation Committee. He later became a senior civil servant.

Shackleton was born in Cloughfold near Rawtenstall, Lancashire. He became a cotton worker at the age of nine. He rose through the ranks of the cotton weavers' union and became general secretary of the Textile Factory Workers Association. He was a member of the Darwen Town Council, and member of the Blackburn Chamber of Commerce.

Although the textile workers had not yet joined the LRC, Shackleton was appointed its candidate for the Clitheroe by-election in 1902. Philip Snowden, who had been considered by the Independent Labour Party, withdrew from the race. The Liberals and Conservatives also withdrew, sensing Shackleton's strong lead. He was thus elected unopposed on 1 August 1902. The textile workers' unions affiliated to the LRC shortly afterwards. Shackleton served as Chairman of the Parliamentary Labour Party for a period.

Shackleton became chairman of the Trades Union Congress in 1906, maintaining his powerful position in the trade union movement. In 1910, Winston Churchill invited him to join the civil service and Shackleton left Parliament. He quickly rose to the rank of permanent secretary in the new Ministry of Labour and is considered the first man from a working-class background to rise to such a senior position.

References

Source
The Lancashire Giant: David Shackleton, Labour Leader and Civil Servant (2000), Ross M Martin,

External links 

1863 births
1938 deaths
People from Cloughfold
Labour Party (UK) MPs for English constituencies
Presidents of the Amalgamated Weavers' Association
Members of the Parliamentary Committee of the Trades Union Congress
Permanent Secretaries of the Ministry of Labour
UK MPs 1900–1906
UK MPs 1906–1910
UK MPs 1910
Presidents of the Trades Union Congress
Textile workers
United Textile Factory Workers' Association-sponsored MPs
Chairs of the Labour Party (UK)
Companions of the Order of the Bath